Parthenodes is a genus of moths of the family Crambidae.

Species
Parthenodes ankasokalis (Viette, 1958)
Parthenodes eugethes (Tams, 1935)
Parthenodes hydrocampalis (Guenée, 1854)
Parthenodes nigriplaga (Swinhoe, 1894)
Parthenodes paralleloidalis 
Parthenodes rectangulalis (Kenrick, 1907)

Former species
Parthenodes latifascialis (Warren, 1896)
Parthenodes sutschana (Hampson, 1900)

References

Natural History Museum Lepidoptera genus database

Musotiminae
Crambidae genera
Taxa named by Achille Guenée